Sharon Dabney (born January 1959) is a retired American track and field athlete.

Career
She was the 1979 Pan American Games Champion at 400 metres in a photo finish over June Griffith.  She also was part of the United States gold medal winning 4x400 metres relay team.  Four years earlier, she was part of the silver medal winning team as a 16 year old.

She was sixth place in the United States Olympic Trials in 1976.  Her 51.55 in 1977 while still at John Bartram High School in Philadelphia was the second fastest 400 at the time, soon to be engulfed by the Howard sisters.  At the time, before Title IX took effect, the high school had no athletic program for girls.  She was the 1977 National Champion.  At the 1980 Olympic Trials, she finished 4th behind Sherri Howard, Gwen Gardner and Denean Howard which should have put her on a likely medal winning relay team for the 1980 Summer Olympics.  However that glory was not to be as for many athletes of her era she was left out of the Olympic by the 1980 Summer Olympics boycott. She did however receive one of 461 Congressional Gold Medals created especially for the spurned athletes. In 1984, she was unable to get out of the quarter finals against Chandra Cheeseborough and Diane Dixon.

While studying at California State University, Los Angeles, she joined the three Howard sisters in setting the long-standing school record.

References

Living people
1959 births
Track and field athletes from Philadelphia
American female sprinters
Pan American Games track and field athletes for the United States
Pan American Games gold medalists for the United States
Pan American Games silver medalists for the United States
Pan American Games medalists in athletics (track and field)
Athletes (track and field) at the 1975 Pan American Games
Athletes (track and field) at the 1979 Pan American Games
California State University, Los Angeles alumni
Congressional Gold Medal recipients
Medalists at the 1975 Pan American Games
Medalists at the 1979 Pan American Games
21st-century American women
Universiade medalists in athletics (track and field)
Universiade bronze medalists for the United States